A Homecoming Queen is a ceremonial role in student homecoming rallies.

Homecoming Queen may also refer to:

Music
 "Homecoming Queen" (song), a song by Hinder from the 2007 album Extreme Behavior
 "Homecoming Queen?", a 2019 song by Kelsea Ballerini
 a song by Brandy Clark from the 2016 album Big Day in a Small Town
 a song by Thelma Plum from the 2019 album Better in Blak
 a song by Sheryl Crow from Feels Like Home
 a song by Sparklehorse
 a 1972 song Kenny O'Dell, written by O'Dell and Larry Henley

Other uses
 Homecoming Queen (horse), an Irish Thoroughbred racehorse
 Homecoming Queen (TV series)

See also
 Homecoming King (disambiguation)
 Homecoming (disambiguation)
 "The Homecoming Queen's Got a Gun", 1983 song by Julie Brown